Alpha Delta Theta is a professional fraternity in the field of medical technology, originally for women.

History

It was founded to unite all women entering into or engaging in the field of medical technology, to promote social and intellectual fellowship among its members, and to raise the prestige of medical technologists by inspiring the members to greater group and individual effort.

Though the Minnesota group was sixteen years older, the Marquette chapter was designated as Alpha chapter and the Minnesota group as the Beta chapter. 

Alpha Delta Theta joined the Professional Panhellenic Association in 1952.

Some professional fraternities became co-educational as a result of Title IX; it is unknown whether Alpha Delta Theta followed this course, or if they remain/remained a women's fraternity only.

As of 2020, Alpha Iota chapter at University of the Sciences in Philadelphia is still active; others may also be active. It is listed there as a women's fraternity.

Traditions and insignia
The colors of Alpha Delta Theta are described as the "green (of medicine) and gold (of science)."

The fraternity flower is the daffodil.

The official pin is described as six-sided with a black background, and bears the Greek letters of ΑΔΘ.

The biannual publication is The Scope.

Both collegiate and graduate/Alumni chapters are created.

Chapters
Chapter information from Baird's Manual (20th), however this record was reprinted from the 19th edition.  Chapters in bold are active, chapters in italics are assumed or known to be dormant.

See also

 Professional fraternities and sororities

References

Honor societies
Student organizations established in 1944
1944 establishments in Wisconsin
Former members of Professional Fraternity Association
Professional medical fraternities and sororities in the United States